Robert Martin Bailey (born September 3, 1968) is a former American football cornerback in the National Football League for the Los Angeles Rams, Washington Redskins, Dallas Cowboys, Detroit Lions and the Baltimore Ravens. He played college football at the University of Miami.

Early years
Bailey attended Miami Southridge High School, where he lettered in football and track & field.

He accepted a scholarship from the University of Miami. As a junior, he started one game and recovered a blocked punt for a touchdown. He started every game in his last year, while tallying 75 tackles, one interception and 11 passes defensed.

Professional career

Los Angeles Rams
Bailey was selected by the Los Angeles Rams in the fourth round (107th overall) of the 1991 NFL Draft. As a rookie, he started the season on the injured reserve list for the first 5 games with a broken bone in his right hand. The tip of his left ring finger was torn off while playing against the Detroit Lions and was placed on injure reserve for the remaining games.

In his second season, he started 6 games at left cornerback, posting 3 interceptions. In 1993, he appeared in 9 games and tied for a team-high 2 interceptions, before suffering a season ending knee injury.

On October 23, 1994, Bailey made the longest punt return in NFL history when he ran 103 yards for a touchdown in a game against the New Orleans Saints. What makes this return stand out is that every single player on the field assumed the ball was going to bounce through the end zone after the punt. Bailey saw that the ball never bounced out of the end zone and was still in play. He scooped the ball up, and returned it for a touchdown before anyone on the Saints realized what had happened. He was waived before the start of the 1995 season.

Washington Redskins
On September 12, 1995, he signed as a free agent with the Washington Redskins to take the place of the injured Muhammad Oliver. He played in 4 games before being released on October 16, to make room for wide receiver Olanda Truitt.

Dallas Cowboys
On October 19, 1995, he was signed by the Dallas Cowboys. He played mainly as a special teams player, until being named the nickel back after Clayton Holmes was suspended under the NFL substance abuse policy. He was a part of the Super Bowl XXX winning team.

Miami Dolphins
On March 7, 1996, the Miami Dolphins signed him as a free agent. He was a backup cornerback that appeared in 14 games and was declared inactive for 2 contests.

Detroit Lions (first stint)
On April 25, 1997, he was signed as a free agent by the Detroit Lions. He registered 15 special teams tackles (fifth on the team).

In 1998, he played as a dime back, making 24 defensive tackles and 11 special teams tackles. The next year, he started 11 games at left cornerback and had 65 tackles, 2 interceptions, 24 passes defensed, 2 sacks and 2 forced fumbles.

Baltimore Ravens
For the 2000 season, he signed with the Baltimore Ravens. He was the team's nickel back, recording 27 tackles, 4 passes defensed, one forced fumble, one fumble recovery and 7 special teams tackles. He earned his second super bowl ring when the Ravens defeated the New York Giants in Super Bowl XXXV at the end of the season. On March 12, 2001, he was released in a salary cap move.

Detroit Lions (second stint)
On May 17, 2001, he was signed by the Detroit Lions to be the team's dime back. He played in 9 games, before suffering a broken neck against the Green Bay Packers that ended his career.

Personal life
Bailey works in the sports marketing business as President of Rosenhaus Sports. ESPN broadcaster Chris Berman once nicknamed him "Beetle" after the comic strip character.

References

American football cornerbacks
Los Angeles Rams players
Dallas Cowboys players
Washington Redskins players
Miami Dolphins players
Miami Hurricanes football players
Detroit Lions players
Baltimore Ravens players
Barbadian players of American football
1968 births
Living people
Sportspeople from Bridgetown